Sigmund Vangsnes (13 January 1926 – 26 September 2017) was a Norwegian educationalist.

He was born in Vik, and graduated with the cand.oecon (roughly equivalent to a Master in Economics) degree from the University of Oslo in 1954. He was the founder and director of the Nordic Institute for Studies in Innovation, Research and Education from 1961 to 1991, branching out of NAVF.

References

1926 births
2017 deaths
People from Vik
University of Oslo alumni
Norwegian educationalists